Pouteria pallida is a species of plant in the family Sapotaceae. It is found in Dominica, Guadeloupe, Martinique, and Saint Lucia.

References

pallida
Endangered plants
Taxonomy articles created by Polbot
Taxa named by Charles Baehni
Taxa named by Karl Friedrich von Gaertner